Schönwies is a municipality in the district of Landeck in the Austrian state of Tyrol located 8 km northeast of the city of Landeck and 7 km west of the city of Imst. The main source of income is the mining of limestone ballast stone.

The highest point in the municipality is the Große Schlenkerspitze (2,827 m) which is also the highest mountain in the eastern Lechtal Alps.

Gallery

References

Lechtal Alps
Cities and towns in Landeck District